Deinandra bacigalupii (sometimes misspelled bacigalupi) is a rare species of flowering plant in the family Asteraceae, known by the common names Livermore tarplant and Livermore moonshine. It is endemic to Alameda County, California, where there are only about five known occurrences around Livermore. It grows in open areas with alkali soils, such as alkali sinks and meadows. This plant was previously included within Deinandra increscens ssp. increscens, but it was separated and elevated to species level in 1999.

The hairy, glandular leaves have narrow linear or lance-shaped blades with smooth or lobed edges. The inflorescence is a cluster of flower heads each surrounded by the upper bracts on the stem branches. The head contains 6 to 9 lobed yellow ray florets, each a few millimeters long, and several yellow disc florets with yellow or brown anthers.

References

External links
Jepson Manual Treatment - Hemizonia bacigalupii (Deinandra bacigalupii)
United States Department of Agriculture Plants Profile: Deinandra bacigalupii
Deinandra bacigalupii - Calphotos Photo gallery, University of California

bacigalupii
Endemic flora of the San Francisco Bay Area
Livermore, California
Natural history of Alameda County, California
Plants described in 1999
Critically endangered flora of California